Ella Gaines Yates (June 14, 1927 – June 27, 2006) is recognized in the library world as being the first African-American director of the Atlanta-Fulton Public Library System in Georgia.

Yates was born into a well known and wealthy family in Atlanta, Georgia. She attended Booker T. Washington High School. She was accepted to Spelman on July 13, 1944. She wrote in her admission letter to the college, "I wish to come to Spelman, because I feel there is no other college anywhere in the world finer for a girl to receive training to prepare her for higher gain in life. I have always looked forward to entering Spelman College, because Spelman students have a certain air about them that denotes character and culture. I would naturally fall in line." Yates graduated with a bachelor's degree from Spelman in 1949. She met her husband, Clayton Yates, at Morehouse College.

Yates received an MLS degree from Atlanta University in 1951, and went on to be a prominent member of African-American librarianship. She was hired as the assistant branch librarian at the Brooklyn Public Library from 1951 to 1955. She then went to the Orange Public Library in New Jersey to become head of the children's department, East Orange Public Library a branch librarian, and Montclair Public Library as an assistant director from 1970 to 1972.

Yates was a member of the American Library Association (ALA) and the Black Caucus of ALA. She was a member of the NAACP, and helped found the Association’s Coretta Scott King Book Award. She published an article entitled "Sexism in the Library Profession." She served as a research writer for the U.S. Civil Rights Commission, and a member of the Delta Sigma Theta sorority. She created her own firm, Yates Library Consultants. She was a visiting professor at Atlanta University Graduate School of Library and Information Science from 1976 to 1981.

Yates and her family moved to Seattle, Washington where she established a Library and Learning Resource Center for the Seattle Opportunities Industrialization Center. She also began teaching at the University of Washington’s Graduate Library School. She later accepted a position as State Librarian of the Virginia State Library. Yates enjoyed this position but was soon plagued with the same issues that she had dealt with in Atlanta. She was dismissed and returned to Atlanta. She returned as interim director in 1998, but left the position on December 31 due to disputes with the library board.

Under her leadership, the Atlanta-Fulton Public Library built its central branch on Margaret Mitchell Square in downtown Atlanta. Yates saw the state-of-the-art facility through its planning and construction stages and presided at the May 1980 dedication ceremonies. She was the first African American librarian in the country to have a major metropolitan library built during her tenure.

She was so concerned about the city receiving a fair deal that she found time to earn a doctoral degree from Atlanta Law School in 1979 so she could understand contracts.

Yates expanded library services for the disabled, ethnic groups, and prisoners. She brought the library into the Fulton County Jail, making it the first penal institution in the country with a public library branch.

Yates died on June 27, 2006 of pancreatic cancer at the age of 79.

References

1927 births
Spelman College alumni
Clark Atlanta University alumni
2006 deaths
American librarians
American women librarians
People from Atlanta
African-American librarians